Miodrag "Skale" Gvozdenović (Cyrillic: Миодраг "Скале" Гвозденовић) (September 19, 1944 – May 8, 2021) was a Yugoslav volleyball player, born in Nikšić. His career started in OK Sutjeska Nikšić. With OK Spartak Subotica he was third in Champions Cup. 

He played over 300 games for national selection of Yugoslavia. With Yugoslavia, he won Bronze medal at the 1975 European Volleyball Championship held in Belgrade.
He was, for sure, one of the best volleyball players of that time in the world. 

He was living and coaching in Subotica (Serbia).

References

Yugoslav men's volleyball players
1944 births
2021 deaths
Sportspeople from Nikšić
Montenegrin men's volleyball players